Nazir Khan may refer to:

 Nazir Ahmed Khan (1904-1983), Pakistani film actor, director and producer
 Ghagge Nazir Khan (c. 1850s–c. 1920s), Indian classical singer and founder of the Mewati gharana
 Nazeer Khan (c. 1860s –1920), Indian classical singer and founder of the Bhendibazaar gharana
 Nazir Ahmad Khan, Pakistani politician and member of the Provincial Assembly of the Punjab
 Nazir Ahmed Khan (politician), politician and former member of the All India Muslim League, National Assembly of Pakistan, and Jamaat-e-Islami Pakistan

See also
 Nadir Khan
 Nasir Khan (disambiguation)
 Nazar Khan (disambiguation)
 Nazim Khan